Ronald Geoffrey Corp,  (born 4 January 1951) is a composer, conductor and Anglican priest. He is founder and artistic director of the New London Orchestra (NLO) and the New London Children's Choir. Corp is musical director of the London Chorus, a position he took up in 1994, and is also musical director of the Highgate Choral Society.

Corp was born and grew up in Wells, Somerset, later studying music at Oxford University. He was appointed Officer of the Order of the British Empire (OBE) in the 2012 New Year Honours for services to music.

Ordained ministry
Corp attended the Southern Theological Education and Training Scheme to prepare for the priesthood. He was ordained in the Church of England as a deacon in 1998 and a priest in 1999. From 1998 to 2002, he served as a non-stipendiary minister (NSM) of St Mary's Church, Kilburn, London. From 2002 to 2007, he served as a NSM at St Mary's Church, Hendon. Since 2007, he has served as a NSM at the Church of St Alban the Martyr, Holborn. All three parishes in which he has served, are in the Anglo-Catholic tradition. He is a member of the Society of the Holy Cross (SSC).

Conductor

New London Orchestra
See also New London Orchestra

When Ronald Corp founded the New London Orchestra in 1988, his conducting career was launched: engagements have included concerts and recordings with many orchestras including the Royal Liverpool Philharmonic Orchestra, Bournemouth Symphony Orchestra, BBC Concert Orchestra, Ulster Orchestra and Royal Scottish National Orchestra, as well as appearing at the BBC Proms.

Through his role as conductor and artistic director, Corp programmes and aims to bring to life repertoire written in the late nineteenth and twentieth centuries which is rarely heard in concert. His introductions from the stage are a key part of his mission to make music more accessible. Together with the New London Orchestra, his championing of neglected music has resulted in some 20 recordings with Hyperion Records which feature composers such as Milhaud, Satie, Elinor Remick Warren, Virgil Thomson, John Foulds and the Polish composer Grażyna Bacewicz; and a series of Light Music Classics, four of them of British, and one each of American Light Music Classics and European Light Music Classics.

The issue in late 2010 by Corp and the NLO of the first digital recording of Rutland Boughton's opera The Queen of Cornwall was designated 'Disc of The Month' in Opera magazine, March 2011 and 'Editor's Choice' in Gramophone, September 2011.

New London Children's Choir 
See also New London Children's Choir
 
The New London Children's Choir was launched by Ronald Corp in 1991 with the aim of introducing children to the challenges and fun of singing and performing all types of music. The Choir is one of the busiest and most successful children's ensembles in the country and has commissioned more than 40 new pieces and premiered numerous other works by composers including its patrons Louis Andriessen and Michael Nyman. It has performed frequently at the Proms, made a number of film soundtrack and TV recordings, including the soundtrack to Star Wars Episode 1, 'The Phantom Menace' and been engaged for concerts and recordings with all the major London orchestras and opera companies. The choir and its members have appeared regularly in major London concert halls working with orchestras such as the London Philharmonic Orchestra, and sing onstage at the English National Opera.

Composer 

Corp began writing music at a very early age. Learning the piano gave him a means of hearing and notating the pieces. He wrote throughout his teens and his undergraduate days at Oxford.

The list of his compositions is extensive and dominated by works for voice, whether solo, for small vocal groupings, church choirs or massive choral societies – Highgate Choral Society and the London Chorus have been regular performers over the years.  His first major choral work And All the Trumpets Sounded was premiered in 1989 by Highgate Choral Society, the composer stating, "My piece focuses on war, the dead and the trumpets of the last judgement". Five years later, and combining text from the Te Deum with Wordsworth and Hopkins, the cantata Laudamus was premiered to great critical acclaim at St John's, Smith Square by the London Choral Society (now the London Chorus).  In 2003 BBC Radio 3 commissioned a major work for the BBC Singers – an a cappella setting of Matthew Arnold's Dover Beach.

Following his work with youth choruses and the formation of the New London Children's Choir, Corp also established himself as a composer for young voices.  On the strength of this reputation, he was commissioned to write for the Farnham Youth Choir who were winners of their section in the 'Sainsbury Choir of the Year' (1998), resulting in Four Elizabethan Lyrics to texts by Shakespeare, Dekker, Jonson and Chidiock Tichborne.  Other substantial works for children's choir include Cornucopia, a cycle of songs with orchestra (1997), and its successor Kaleidoscope (2002) which includes a setting of 'The Owl and the Pussycat'.  His Christmas opera Wenceslas was premiered by the New London Children's Choir in 1982 and revived in 2008, while a more recent children's opera, The Ice Mountain, had three performances in 2010–11 by the same choir, and has been recorded.

His interest in literature is evident in the many song-sets devoted to settings of a single poet, e.g. The Music of Francis Thompson which received its première at Benslow Music Trust in January 2010. An earlier set, The Music of Whitman, had its première at the 2011 Tardebigge English Song Festival in Worcestershire, performed by Mark Stone (baritone) and Stephen Barlow (piano); while The Music of Browning was first performed in October of the same year as part of the Little Venice Music Festival with Robert Presley (baritone) and Andrew Robinson (piano). In March 2013, the baritone Lee Tsang premiered The Music of Larkin at Middleton Hall in Hull, Yorkshire. There are also discrete songs such as the humorous The Bath, and song-cycles such as Flower of Cities which takes London as its unifying theme.

Among his orchestral works are Symphony No. 1 (2009) which evokes "a journey from darkness to light" and the programmatic triptych Guernsey Postcards (2004) with its depictions of a local fair, Pembroke Bay and St. Peter Port, commissioned by the Guernsey Camerata.

Another large-scale work is the Piano Concerto No.1 (1997) which has received three performances by pianists Julian Evans and Leon McCawley and was described by one critic as,

 
... possibly the most winningly successful British Piano Concerto of the last forty years or so. It is, wholly exceptionally, very well written in true virtuoso pianistic style.

The String Quartet No.1 'The Bustard' was premiered at the Wigmore Hall by the Maggini Quartet in 2008.

On Saturday 9 July 2011, Corp celebrated his 60th birthday year at the Royal Festival Hall in London with a performance of And All the Trumpets Sounded and the world première of The Wayfarer (In Homage to Mahler) for 16 solo singers and orchestra – a setting of two of Mahler's own poems from his Lieder eines fahrenden Gesellen and of his early poem 'Im Lenz'. Ronald Corp conducted the NLO, and the combined forces of Highgate Choral Society, The London Chorus and the New London Children's Choir were deployed in the rest of the concert. A pre-concert talk took place with Corp in conversation with Richard Morrison.

On 23 November 2011 a new anthem Laudate Dominum was performed at the Festival of St. Cecilia Service at Westminster Cathedral. This had been specially commissioned by the Musicians Benevolent Fund and was sung by the combined choirs of Westminster Cathedral, Westminster Abbey and St. Paul's Cathedral under Martin Baker.

The Queen's Diamond Jubilee was celebrated by a special concert given at the Barbican by Highgate Choral Society and the NLO on Saturday 9 June 2012, to include the première of This Sceptr'd Isle by Corp, a stirring seven-minute setting of text from Shakespeare's Richard II, the orchestra replete with surging sea-imagery and fanfares for four trumpets.

Corp's orchestrations of Erik Satie's Gnossiennes are featured in the film Chocolat of 2000.

More detailed information on Corp's life as a composer can be found on the Ronald Corp website.

Recent works 

An interest in Buddhist literature is reflected in his setting of parts of the Dhammapada (2010) for eight solo singers (or SATB choir) interspersed with recordings of bells at temples sacred to the Buddha; and the cycle Songs of the Elder Sisters (from the Therigatha) for mezzo-soprano, baritone, alto flute, clarinet and viola.  The latter was recorded in February 2012 with Sarah Castle (mezzo-soprano) and Sam Evans (baritone) while Dhammapada had been recorded and released by Stone Records in 2011.

Andrew Stewart writes: "How does the composer respond to those who question why a Christian minister was drawn to set a fundamental Buddhist text? Dhammapada, he says, was created to open dialogue among faiths: 'It’s about inviting people to open their ears and minds to spirituality. These words, thought to be by the Buddha himself, tell us essential truths, which stand against cynical and untrusting ways of seeing the world and our place in it.' Dhammapada contemplates the corrupting force of material things and the transience of wealth, beauty and power."

The music critic Michael Church reviewed the recording thus: "...Set for small choir, it becomes a beguiling work, full of scrunchy dissonances but graceful to the ear", designating it 'Album of the Week' in The Independent, 29 January 2011.

Also recorded in May 2012 were the String Quartet No. 3, the Clarinet Quintet 'Crawhall' and The Yellow Wallpaper for mezzo-soprano and string quintet, all composed in 2011.  In these, the Maggini String Quartet are joined by Andrew Marriner (clarinet), Rebecca de Pont Davies (mezzo-soprano) and John Tattersdill (double bass).  Regarding the subtitle of 'Crawhall' for the Quintet, Ronald Corp states:

Joseph Crawhall (1821–1896) was an engraver, writer, businessman, patron of arts, book designer, collector of antiquities, campaigner for the perseveration of architecture and a significant character in the life of Newcastle.  His colourful life and wonderful woodblock illustrations have inspired this clarinet quintet which I hope gives some flavour of this most remarkable and likeable man.

The Yellow Wallpaper is a dramatic scena with text by Francis Booth adapted from the short story of Charlotte Perkins Gilman.  This work continues the current trend for chamber compositions and unconventional instrumental/vocal groupings: Lullaby for a Lost Soul features a setting for counter-tenor, vibraphone, flute and cello with re-imaginings of the melancholy music of John Dowland.  The text follows themes of loss, death and helplessness. It was recorded in September 2012.

In January 2013, three of these works, The Yellow Wallpaper, Songs of the Elder Sisters and Lullaby for a Lost Soul were performed at the event 'Corp de Ballet' in collaboration with The Chantry Dance Company for a CD launch at the Village Underground, Shoreditch, London.

Recordings of Corp's music

Beside the recordings shown in the discography below, other recordings of compositions by Corp include:

And All the Trumpets Sounded performed by The London Chorus, Mark Stone (baritone) and Bournemouth Symphony Orchestra under Corp on Dutton Epoch (2011).
A Christmas Mass sung by Chantage on the disc Hark! Chantage at Christmas on EMI (2008).
Five Flower Songs, Spring (When Daisies pied), Give to my Eyes, Lord and 'At Day-close in November' plus children's choir works by other composers on Pigs Could Fly, performed by the New London Children's Choir on Naxos (2008).
Susanni sung by Worcester Cathedral Choir under Donald Hunt on the disc Joy to the World – A selection from The Novello Book of Carols on Hyperion/Helios (2003).
A Cradle Song with the Armagh Girl Singers under Aubrey McClintock on Lammas Records (1999).

Discography

{| class="wikitable"
|-
! Disc Title 
! Contents 
! Performers 
! Label and Catalogue Number 
! Recording and 
Release Dates

|-
! Hail! Bright Cecelia 1947 – 2001
|A Selection Of Anthems Commissioned By The Musician's Benevolent Fund

God Is Gone Up (Gerald Finzi)
Come Down, O Love Divine (John Rutter)
Lord, Thou Hast Been Our Refuge (John Joubert)
Christus Vincit (James MacMillan)
God Is Our Hope And Strength (Simon Preston)
Thou Mastering Me God (Jonathan Harvey)
King Of Glory (Herbert Howells)
Annunciation (John Tavener)
Sing, Mortals! (Arthur Bliss)
Live For Ever, Glorious Lord (George Dyson)
The Voice Out Of The Whirlwind (Ralph Vaughan Williams)
betwixt Heaven And Charing Cross (Anthony Payne)
|BBC Singers
cond. by Ronald Corp
Stephen Disley (organ)
|MUSICIANS BENEVOLENT FUND RECORDS 
MBF 1 
|2004/
August 2004

|-
!Forever Child and Other Choral Music 
|Forever Child
Verbum Patris 
Give to my Eyes, Lord (Colin Coppen)
'May the Lord Bless You and Keep You' 
(from Adonai Echad)
Dover Beach (Arnold)
'Weep You no more, Sad Fountains' (from Cornucopia)
Two Partsongs ('Heraclitus' and 
'I Strove with None')
Missa San Marco 
Four Elizabethan Lyrics 
Fear No More the Heat o' the Sun (Shakespeare)
Lute-Book Lullaby (Sweet was the Song)
Requiem (R. L. Stevenson)

| Voces Cantabiles
cond. by Ronald Corp 
| DUTTON EPOCH
CDLX 7171 
| 2005/
May 2006

|-
! [Orchestral Works]
| Guernsey Postcards
Piano Concerto No. 1
Symphony No. 1

| Royal Liverpool
Philharmonic Orchestra
cond. by Ronald Corp
Leon McCawley (piano)
| DUTTON EPOCH 
CDLX 7233
| June 2009/
Nov. 2009

|-
! The Songs of Ronald Corp|The Music of Housman
The Music of Whitman 
Flower of Cities
Give to my Eyes, Lord (Colin Coppen)
Break, break, break (Tennyson)
The Owl and the Pussycat (Lear)
Sleep (John Fletcher)
Toward the Unknown Region (Whitman)
The Bath (Harry Graham)
and song arrangements from Cornucopia
|Mark Stone (baritone)
Simon Lepper (piano)
|STONE RECORDS 
5060192780031
|2010/
Oct. 2010

|-
! String Quartets|String Quartet No. 1 'The Bustard'
String Quartet No. 2
Country Matters 
(song-cycle for tenor and string trio to poems
by Steve Mainwaring)
| Maggini String Quartet
Marke Wilde (tenor)
| NAXOS 8.570578
|2010/
March 2011

|-
! Dhammapada| Dhammapada
| Apsara Chamber Choir
cond. by Ronald Corp
| STONE RECORDS 
5060192780055
| 2010/
Jan. 2011

|-
! The Ice Mountain| The Ice Mountain (an opera for
children's voices and small ensemble or
piano, libretto by Emma Hill based on an old
Swiss legend 'Die alte Frau and did Toten')
| The New London Children's Choir
Members of New London Orchestra
cond. by Ronald Corp
| NAXOS 8.572777
| 2010/
May 2011

|-
! Things I didn't say| Things I didn't say (Steve Mainwaring)
The Revival (Henry Vaughan) 
Never weather-beaten Sail (Thomas Campion)
Three Medieval Carols
Ave Maria
Ave verum
The Pilgrim (John Bunyan)
Psalm 150
The Bells of Paradise
We Will Remember Them (Laurence Binyon)
| Apsara Chamber Choir
Edward Batting (organ)
cond. by Ronald Corp
|STONE RECORDS
5060192780185
|2010-2011/
2012

|-
!String, Paper, Wood| String Quartet No. 3
The Yellow Wallpaper
(for mezzo-soprano and string quintet)
Clarinet Quintet 'Crawhall'
| Rebecca de Pont Davies 
(mezzo-soprano)
Andrew Marriner (clarinet)
John Tattersdill (double bass)
Maggini String Quartet
| STONE RECORDS
5060192780246
|May 2012/
Jan. 2013

|-
!Songs of the Elder Sisters| Songs of the Elder Sisters
(cycle of songs and interludes for mezzo-soprano,
baritone, alto flute, clarinet and viola, 
to texts translated from the Pali by Francis Booth)
|Sarah Castle (mezzo-soprano)
Samuel Evans (baritone)
Jill Carter (alto flute)
Sarah Thurlow (clarinet)
Rachel Bolt (viola)
| STONE RECORDS
5060192780369
|March 2012/
2013

|-
!Lullaby for a Lost Soul'''| Lullaby for a Lost Soul(cycle for counter-tenor, flute, vibraphone
and cello to poems by Francis Booth, with
"re-imaginings" of the music of John Dowland 
as Interludes)
| Magid El-Bushra (counter-tenor)
Jill Carter (flute)
Matthew Turner (vibraphone)
Julia Desbrulais (cello)
| STONE RECORDS
5060192780413
|Sept. 2012/
2014

|}

 List of compositions 

The music of Ronald Corp is published by Boosey and Hawkes (BH), Chester Music (C), Colla Voce (CV), Faber Music (F), Novello (N), Oxford University Press (OUP), Royal Society of Church Music (RSCM), Stainer and Bell (SB), Trinity Guildhall (TG) and the Ronald Corp website (RC).  Where no publisher is given, please refer to the Ronald Corp website.

Programme notes, music excerpts and links to publishers and score purchasing facilities can be found on the Ronald Corp website.

 References 

 External links 
 
 Ronald Corp on Stone Records
 Ronald Corp on Hyperion
 Ronald Corp recordings on iTunes
 The Independent newspaper interview with Edward Seckerson on 28 June 2011 
  of the Clarinet Quintet 'Crawhall', third movement – Allegretto grazioso played by Andrew Marriner and the Maggini String Quartet
  of excerpt from Dhammapada performed by Apsara Chamber Choir directed by the composer
  of Ronald Corp's setting of 'The Owl and the Pussycat' performed by Mark Stone and Simon Lepper
 Video of excerpts from the 2012 recording of Songs of the Elder Sisters'' with the Chantry Dance Company
 Archive of premières and significant performances of Ronald Corp's music 2007–2012
 Bacewicz Music for Strings on Hyperion

English composers
English conductors (music)
British male conductors (music)
1951 births
Living people
21st-century English Anglican priests
People from Wells, Somerset
Alumni of Christ Church, Oxford
Officers of the Order of the British Empire
English Anglo-Catholics
Anglo-Catholic clergy
21st-century British conductors (music)
21st-century British male musicians